Anastasiya Tyurina (born 27 September 2001) is a Tajikistani swimmer. She competed in the women's 50 metre freestyle event at the 2016 Summer Olympics, finishing 73rd with a time of 31.15 seconds and failing to advance out of the heats.

In 2019, she represented Tajikistan at the 2019 World Aquatics Championships held in Gwangju, South Korea. She competed in the women's 50 metre freestyle and women's 50 metre butterfly events. In both events she did not advance to compete in the semi-finals.

In 2021, she competed in the women's 50 metre freestyle event at the 2020 Summer Olympics held in Tokyo, Japan.

References

External links
 

2001 births
Living people
Tajikistani female butterfly swimmers
Olympic swimmers of Tajikistan
Swimmers at the 2016 Summer Olympics
Sportspeople from Dushanbe
Tajikistani people of Russian descent
Swimmers at the 2018 Asian Games
Swimmers at the 2018 Summer Youth Olympics
Asian Games competitors for Tajikistan
Tajikistani female freestyle swimmers
Swimmers at the 2020 Summer Olympics